Southam is an unincorporated community in Ramsey County, in the U.S. state of North Dakota.

References

Unincorporated communities in Ramsey County, North Dakota
Unincorporated communities in North Dakota